Formula Asia, also known as Asian Formula 2000, was a class of open wheel formula racing.  The formula used an Argo chassis coupled with a 16-valve Ford Zetec 1,800cc engine.

There was only one championship held in Asia from 1994 until 2002, organized and promoted by Motorsport Asia Ltd. It was established to assist young Asian drivers make the transition from karting to European formulae such as Formula Ford and Formula Renault. Rounds were held in India, Indonesia, Malaysia and China. A special invitation race was also held annually at the Macau Grand Prix. It was replaced by Formula BMW Asia in 2003.

Japanese female driver Keiko Ihara finished third in the AF2000 race at the 2002 Macau Grand Prix, becoming the first woman on the podium in the event's 50-year history.

Drivers who have taken part in Formula Asia include: Michael Vergers, Narain Karthikeyan, Alex Yoong, Ananda Mikola, Bagoes Hermanto, Takuma Sato, Mark Goddard, Parthiva Sureshwaren, Karun Chandhok, Denis Lian, Jim Ka To and Danny Watts.

The cars were later used as a support class with the Asian Formula Three cars.

Past champions

1996  Narain Karthikeyan
1997  Bagoes Hermanto
1998  Ben Walsh
1999  Nattapong Horthongkum
2000  Ng Wai-Leong
2001  Karun Chandhok
2002  Denis Lian

Macau Asian Formula 2000 Challenge winners
1999  Takuma Sato
2000  Philippe Descombes
2001  Philippe Descombes 
2002  Danny Watts

References

Formula racing
Recurring sporting events established in 1994
Recurring sporting events disestablished in 2002
One-make series